Blue Moods is the second studio album by Miles Davis, released on Charles Mingus' Debut Records label in late 1955. It brings Miles Davis on trumpet together with Charles Mingus on bass, trombonist Britt Woodman, vibraphonist Teddy Charles, and drummer Elvin Jones. The arrangement of "Alone Together" is by Charles Mingus, while the other tracks were arranged by Teddy Charles.

According to the original sleeve notes, the short playing time of the album was because "the recording was cut at 160 lines per inch (instead of the usual 210 to 260 lines per inch) making the grooves wider and deeper and allowing for more area between the grooves for bass frequencies ... and was deemed necessary to reproduce the extended bass range and give the listener more quality to that of high fidelity tape recording." It was also included in the Charles Mingus Complete Debut Recordings 12CD box-set.

Critical reception

The Allmusic review by Alex Henderson stated "Blue Moods is an excellent example of cool jazz. However, not all of the musicians who join Davis on this album were full-time members of jazz's cool school... But even so, Blue Moods offers considerable rewards to those who have a taste for '50s cool jazz".

Track listing

Personnel
Miles Davis – trumpet
Britt Woodman – trombone
Charles Mingus – bass
Teddy Charles – vibes
Elvin Jones – drums

References

1955 albums
Miles Davis albums
Debut Records albums
Albums recorded at Van Gelder Studio